Edward Louis Finney (November 4, 1924 – March 17, 1998), nicknamed "Mike", was an American Negro league third baseman in the 1940s.

A native of Akron, Ohio, Finney made his Negro leagues debut in 1947 for the Baltimore Elite Giants, and played for Baltimore again in 1948. He died in Akron in 1998 at age 73.

References

External links
 and Seamheads

1924 births
1998 deaths
Baltimore Elite Giants players
Baseball third basemen
Baseball players from Akron, Ohio
20th-century African-American sportspeople